Huilong is a town of Da'an District, Zigong, Sichuan, People's Republic of China, situated  east-southeast of downtown Zigong. , it has one residential community (社区) and 17 villages under its administration.

See also 
 List of township-level divisions of Sichuan

References 

Towns in Sichuan
Zigong